San Rafael del Río (Spanish) or Sant Rafael Del Riu (Valencian) is a municipality in the province of Castellón, Valencian Community, Spain. The town is located near the Senia River.

References

Municipalities in the Province of Castellón
Baix Maestrat